Fixer is an unincorporated community in Lee County, Kentucky, United States.

A post office was established in the community in 1917. According to legend, it was given the name Fixer by an exasperated resident, who after submitting several rejected entries to postal authorities, declared that he was done suggesting place names and if the post office didn't like it, they could "fix 'er" themselves.

References

Unincorporated communities in Lee County, Kentucky
Unincorporated communities in Kentucky